Valter Tomaz Júnior (born July 25, 1978) is a Brazilian retired football player who last played for Assyriska BK and Örgryte IS and Molde FK before that.

Career
Valter signed for Assyriska BK in March 2012.

Career statistics

References

External links
  Player profile on Molde FK official club website

1978 births
Living people
Brazilian footballers
Brazilian expatriate footballers
Örgryte IS players
Molde FK players
Allsvenskan players
Eliteserien players
Norwegian First Division players
Expatriate footballers in Norway
Brazilian expatriate sportspeople in Norway
Expatriate footballers in Sweden
Brazilian expatriate sportspeople in Sweden
Association football midfielders
Footballers from São Paulo